The Madagascar women's national basketball team is the nationally controlled basketball team representing Madagascar at international basketball competitions for women. The squad won the African championship in 1970.

It is administrated by the Fédération Malagasy de Basket-Ball.

See also
Madagascar women's national under-19 basketball team
Madagascar women's national under-17 basketball team
Madagascar women's national 3x3 team

References

External links
Archived records of Madagascar team participations
Fédération Malagasy de Basket Ball  - Facebook Presentation
Madagascar Women National Team 2011 Presentation at Afrobasket.com

Basketball in Madagascar
Women's national basketball teams
National sports teams of Madagascar
Basketball teams in Madagascar